Ajay Singh Deol (born 19 October 1956), better known as Sunny Deol, is an Indian film actor, director and producer known for his work in Hindi cinema. In a film career spanning over thirty five years and over hundred films, Deol has won two National Film Awards and two Filmfare Awards.

Deol made his debut opposite fellow debutante Amrita Singh in Betaab (1982). He received a Filmfare Award for Best Actor nomination for his performance. Subsequently, he went on to star in numerous successful films in the 1980s and 1990s. He made his debut as a director and producer with Dillagi, in which he starred alongside his brother Bobby. His critically recognized work includes Manzil Manzil (1984), Saveray Wali Gaadi (1986), Sultanat (1986), Dacait (1987), Yateem (1988), Veerta (1993), Darr (1993), Imtihaan (1994), Salaakhen (1998) and Farz (2001).

With his portrayal of an amateur boxer wrongly accused of his brother's murder in Rajkumar Santoshi's critically and commercially successful Ghayal in 1990, Deol gained wide recognition and praise. The film went on to win seven Filmfare Awards and his performance won him the National Film Award – Special Jury Award / Special Mention (Feature Film) and the Filmfare Award for Best Actor. His portrayal of a lawyer in the film Damini – Lightning (1993) fetched him several accolades including the National Film Award for Best Supporting Actor and the Filmfare Award for Best Supporting Actor. Anil Sharma's Gadar: Ek Prem Katha (2001), in which Deol portrayed a lorry driver who falls in love with a Muslim girl, was the highest-grossing Bollywood film ever at the time of its release, and garnered him another Filmfare Award for Best Actor nomination. Deol's successful films include The Hero: Love Story of a Spy (2003), Apne (2007), Yamla Pagla Deewana (2011) and Ghayal Once Again (2016). These accomplishments have established him as a leading actor of the Hindi film industry.

Major associations

National Film Awards

Filmfare Awards

IIFA Awards

Screen Awards

Zee Cine Awards

Other awards

Lions Gold Awards

Won 
 2002: Best Actor for Gadar: Ek Prem Katha by the Sansui Viewers' Choice Movie Awards.

Nominated 
 2011: Best Actor for Yamla Pagla Deewana by Bhaskar Bollywood Awards.
 2011: Jodi No. 1 for Yamla Pagla Deewana (with Dharmendra and Bobby Deol) by Bhaskar Bollywood Awards.

References

External links
 

Lists of awards received by Indian actor